"The Dreaming City" is a novella written by Michael Moorcock, which first appeared in Science Fantasy issue 47, in June 1961. It was the first story to feature the character Elric of Melniboné.

"The Dreaming City" has been reprinted in several collections of Moorcock's Elric stories, including The Stealer of Souls (Spearman, 1963), The Stealer of Souls and Other Stories (Lancer / Mayflower, 1967), The Weird of the White Wolf (DAW, 1977), Elric of Melniboné (Millennium / Orion, 1993), Elric: Song of the Black Sword (White Wolf, 1995), Elric (Gollancz / Orion, 2001), Elric: The Stealer of Souls (Del Rey, 2008), and Elric: Sailor on the Seas of Fate (Gollancz, 2013).

In 1982, Marvel Comics adapted the novella into a graphic novel written by Roy Thomas and illustrated by P. Craig Russell. In 2021, Titan Comics released a serialized comic book adaptation of The Dreaming City written by Julien Blondel with art by Julien Telo.

This novella should not be confused with the 1972 novel Elric of Melniboné, which has occasionally been published under the title The Dreaming City by Lancer Books (1972) and Magnum Books (1975) but is actually a distinct story from the 1961 novella of this name.

Plot
Elric, emperor of Melniboné, returns to the dreaming city of Imrryr where he plans to slay his cousin, Yyrkoon, and reclaim his love Cymoril with an armada of mercenary ships. After the mercenaries lay waste to Melniboné's outer defenses, Elric guides his fleet through a secret maze of caves to reach the civilization within. As the fighting continues, Elric steals away to meet Cymoril at a hidden spot among the city's towers but finds her imprisoned by Yyrkoon, who attacks him with a powerful spell. Elric battles his cousin with the soul-devouring, rune-forged sword Stormbringer and defeats him but kills Cymoril by accident.

Ruined by grief, Elric flees the smoldering ruins of Melniboné with the remainder of his mercenary fleet, whose strength is depleted by the attack and subsequent looting of the city's riches. The fleet is surprised by the warships of Melniboné and the dragons which had been roused by the attack. Elric calls upon the black magic passed down to him by his ancestors to aid their escape, but the pursuers move swiftly to overtake the mercenaries. Unable to summon enough strength to save all the ships, Elric saves only himself and his crewmen, speeding away on the winds of elemental forces.

When his ship comes within sight of a harbor, Elric tries to break his bond with Stormbringer by hurling it into the ocean. The magic blade hovers above the water, and Elric jumps from the ship to reclaim it, fearing his albino weakness will overcome him without Stormbringer's power. He swims to shore alone, while his crew curses him for being traitor and coward.

References

British fantasy novels
1961 British novels
Books by Michael Moorcock
British novellas